There are around  of roads (national, regional and provincial) in Morocco.

The high speed train - TGV - will have a capacity of 500 passengers and will carry 8 million passengers per year. The work on the High Speed Rail project was started in September 2011. Construction of infrastructure and delivery of railway equipment will end in 2014 and the HSR will be operational by December 2015.

Government policy 
With billions of dollars committed to improving the country's infrastructure, Morocco aims to become a world player in terms of marine transport. The 2008-2012 investment plan aims to invest $16.3 billion and will contribute to major projects such as the combined port and industrial complex of the Tanger-Med and the construction of a high-speed train between Tangier and Casablanca. The plan will also improve and expand the existing highway system and expand the Casablanca Mohammed V International Airport. Morocco's transport sector is one of the kingdom's most dynamic, and will remain so for years to come. The improvements in infrastructure will boost other sectors and will also help the country in its goal of attracting 10 million tourists by 2010.

Railways 

1907 km  standard gauge, 1003 km electrified with 3 kV DC.

High speed lines 

There are plans for several high-speed lines. Work by ONCF began in September 2011 on a first section from Tangier to Kenitra. There are plans to construct two core lines, one from Tangier in the north via Marrakesh to Agadir in the south, and a second from Casablanca on the Atlantic to Oujda on the Algerian border. If all of these plans will be approved, the 1,500 kilometres of track may take until 2035 to complete at a cost of around 100 billion dirhams ($10 billion).

Potential speed gains are large, with travel time from Casablanca to Marrakesh down from 3 hours to 1:20, and from the capital Rabat to Tangier from 4:30 to 1:30.

The second High-Speed Rail (HSR) which is planned to be built after Tangier-Kenitra is the HSR Marrakech-Essaouira (180 km) followed by a new HSR Rabat-Meknes (130 km). The last high-speed lines will connect these two old empire cities to the Atlantique coast in less than one hour instead of two hours now.

The current high-speed line Tangier-Kenitra under construction was impacted by delays resulting from issues about land acquisitions because this operation was performed by different provincial governors, in order to avoid such delays on the next high-speed rail Marrakech-Essaouira, the national railway company ONCF was given the green light to start the land acquisition and expropriation procedure.

Other routes 
A railway connecting Nador to the existing network at Taourirt was finished in 2010, after it had been under construction since 2007.

Tramways 
 Rabat-Salé tramway (2011)
 Casablanca Tramway (2012)

Roads 
As of 2006 there were around 57625 kilometres of roads (national, regional and provincial) in Morocco, and an additional 1808 kilometers of highways (August 2016).

Principal national roads:
National Route 1 (Morocco)
National Route 2 (Morocco)
National Route 3 (Morocco)
National Route 4 (Morocco)
National Route 5 (Morocco)
National Route 6 (Morocco)
National Route 7 (Morocco)
National Route 8 (Morocco)
National Route 9 (Morocco)
National Route 10 (Morocco)
National Route 11 (Morocco)
National Route 12 (Morocco)
National Route 13 (Morocco)
National Route 14 (Morocco)
National Route 15 (Morocco)
National Route 16 (Morocco)

Highways 

Rabat Ring Road (42 km)
A1 Casablanca-Rabat (86 km)
A1 Casablanca–Safi (255 km)
A2 Rabat-Fes (190 km)
A2 Fes-Oujda (306 km)
A3 Casablanca-Marrakesh (220 km)
A3 extension to Agadir (233 km)
A4 Berrechid-Benni Mellal (172 km)
A5 Rabat-Tangier Med (308 km)
A7 Tetouan-Fnideq (28 km)

Major airports 

Agadir -- Agadir–Al Massira Airport: (AGA) Flights to most major European cities.
Al Hoceima -- Cherif Al Idrissi Airport: (AHU) Flights to Brussels, Charleroi, Amsterdam and Rotterdam
Casablanca -- Mohammed V International Airport: (CMN) Arrivals and departures to worldwide destinations.
Fez -- Fes–Saïss Airport: (FEZ) Flights to Europe and Casablanca
Laayoune -- Hassan I Airport: (EUN) Flights to Agadir, Casablanca, Dakhla and Las Palmas.
Marrakech -- Marrakesh Menara Airport: (RAK) Flights all major international airports in Western Europe
Nador -- Nador International Airport: (NDR) Flights to Amsterdam, Brussels, Casablanca, Cologne, Düsseldorf and Paris.
Oujda -- Angads Airport: (OUD) Flights to Amsterdam, Casablanca, Marseille and Paris.
Ouarzazate -- Ouarzazate Airport: (OZZ) Flights to Casablanca and Paris.
Rabat -- Rabat–Salé Airport: (RBA) Flights to Paris and Tripoli.
Tangier -- Tangier Ibn Battouta Airport: (TNG) Flights all major international airports in Western Europe

National airlines 
 Air Arabia Maroc
 Royal Air Maroc
 Royal Air Maroc Express

Merchant marine 
total: 35 ships ( or over) by type:
cargo ship 3,
chemical tanker 6,
container ship 8,
passenger/cargo ship 12,
petroleum tanker 1,
refrigerated cargo ship 1,
roll-on/roll-off 4

Foreign-owned: 14 (France 13, Germany 1) (2007)
Registered in other countries: 4 (Gibraltar)

Maritime companies 

 Acciona Trasmediterránea
 Baleària
 Comanav
 Comarit
 FerriMaroc
 FRS Iberia
 Grandi Navi Veloci
 Grimaldi Lines
 International Maritime Transport Corporation
 Naviera Armas

Intercity bus companies 
Bus service in Morocco offers access almost to every corner of the country. There's a big choice of carriers at bus stations, among them:

 CTM
 Supratours

Sports car 
 Laraki

References

External links 
 UN Map